The Resistance is an American professional wrestling promotion, formerly known as Resistance Pro Wrestling, founded by musician Billy Corgan, alongside brothers Jacques and Gabe Baron. The promotion holds monthly events around Chicago, attracting "between 300 and 600 people per event." The company's headquarters are located in Lockport, Illinois. Corgan left the promotion in November 2014. The company's website was down as of August 3, 2018, and their YouTube channel has been inactive since November 2017. As of October 2018, it is being reported that Billy Corgan has re-purchased and is reviving the brand National Wrestling Alliance (NWA) including a full back-catalogue and 20-year success plan.

History

Their first show, Black Friday, debuted November 25, 2011, at the Excalibur nightclub in Chicago. 22 wrestlers competed in the original event. Chicagoans Jay Bradley, Taylor Made, Miss December and Colt Cabana were involved in Black Friday. Other wrestlers included The Sheik, El Generico, Harry Smith, Kevin Steen, Raven (Agent), Teddy Hart and Cheerleader Melissa.

Corgan has also launched a concussion-awareness program tied to Resistance Pro. The wrestling promotion company has partnered with the Chicago Concussion Coalition and doctors from Midwest Orthopedics at Rush hospital. Doctors conduct screens with the wrestlers before and after each event. Corgan and his partners also forbid certain wrestling moves that involve contact to the head to minimize the risk of concussions.

Corgan's group is the first professional wrestling promotion to follow guidelines set by the Sports Legacy Institute (SLI). Corgan is personal friends with SLI founder Christopher Nowinski.

During Black Friday, Resistance Pro crowned its first Resistance Pro Women's Champion, Melanie Cruise. Although the Smashing Pumpkins were on tour in Europe for the first Resistance Pro show, Corgan watched it live, via Skype.

Resistance Pro's second show, Rise, took place on January 13, 2012, at Excalibur. Wrestlers Melanie Cruise, Colt Cabana, The Daivari Brothers, Teddy Hart, Mr. 450, Da Soul Touchaz, Robert Anthony, Serenity, and Taylor Made all took part in the first all-ages show. Corgan was on hand to crown the Resistance Prop Champion Harry Smith.

The promotion company's third show, Vicious Circle, took place on February 17, 2012, at Excalibur. The all-ages show featured professional wrestlers: Mr. 450, "The Ego" Robert Anthony, "Lonesome" Jay Bradley, Resistance Pro Champion Harry Smith and Resistance Pro Women's Champion Melanie Cruise. "Lonesome" Jay Bradley issued an "Open Challenge" for the event.

Resistance Pro Champion Harry Smith successfully defended his title against Rhino Friday night at the Vicious Circle show at Excalibur in Chicago. Rhino, the final original ECW champion, challenged Smith to a rematch and put his vacated ECW championship belt against Smith's Resistance Pro's heavyweight belt.

One of wrestling's most famous tag teams, The Rock 'n' Roll Express, Ricky Morton and Robert Gibson, made an appearance, taking on Kentucky Fried, "Original Recipe" Matt Cage and "Extra Crispy" Alex Castle.

Resistance Pro's fourth event, Obsession, is scheduled for March 23, 2012. The event broke attendance records for the promotion with over 1,600 people attending in an arena in Crystal Lake, Illinois, the arena is usually reserved for mixed martial arts events but will now hold regular Resistance events.

On November 15, 2014, Corgan announced he had left Resistance Pro.

Reality series
In March 2014, it was reported that Corgan was in discussions with American television channel AMC to develop an unscripted reality series about Resistance Pro. The premise is a behind-the-scenes look at the promotion as Corgan "takes over creative direction for the independent wrestling company." The show was given the green light by AMC, under the working title of "Untitled Billy Corgan Wrestling Project," the same month. However, the project was canceled shortly thereafter by AMC.

Championships

Current champions

See also
List of independent wrestling promotions in the United States

References

External links

Independent professional wrestling promotions based in the Midwestern United States
Companies based in Will County, Illinois
2011 establishments in Illinois
Entertainment companies established in 2011
Professional wrestling in the Chicago metropolitan area
Billy Corgan